The 2004 Brickyard 400, the 11th running of the event, was a NASCAR Nextel Cup Series race held on August 8, 2004, at Indianapolis Motor Speedway in Speedway, Indiana. Contested at 161 laps – extended from 160 laps due to a green–white–checker finish – on the 2.5 mile (4.023 km) speedway, it was the twenty-first race of the 2004 NASCAR NEXTEL Cup Series season. Jeff Gordon of Hendrick Motorsports won the race.

Background

The Indianapolis Motor Speedway, located in Speedway, Indiana, (an enclave suburb of Indianapolis) in the United States, is the home of the Indianapolis 500 and the Brickyard 400. The track's turns are banked at 9 degrees, while the front stretch, the location of the finish line, has no banking. The back stretch, opposite of the front, also has a zero degree banking. The racetrack has seats for more than 250,000 spectators.

Summary
For the first time in Nextel Cup Series history, the Green-white-checker finish rule caused a race to be extended, in this case for one additional lap. On the extra lap, Casey Mears blew a tire, Ricky Rudd hit the wall, then Mark Martin and Dale Earnhardt Jr. suffered tire failures. Jeff Gordon retained the lead to become the first four-time winner of the Brickyard.

Race results

Failed to qualify: Kevin Lepage (#51), Hermie Sadler (#02), Morgan Shepherd (#89), Greg Sacks (#13), Andy Hillenburg (#37), Geoffrey Bodine (#34), Kirk Shelmerdine (#72)

Race statistics
 Time of race: 3:29:56
 Average Speed: 
 Pole Speed: 186.293
 Cautions: 13 for 47 laps
 Margin of Victory: under caution
 Lead changes: 9
 Percent of race run under caution: 29.2%         
 Average green flag run: 8.8 laps

References

Brickyard 400
Brickyard 400
NASCAR races at Indianapolis Motor Speedway